Lubina is a village and municipality in the Trenčín Region of Slovakia.

Lubina may also refer to:

Anela Lubina, Croatian footballer 
Janicel Lubina, Filipino beauty pageant titleholder and actress 
Ladislav Lubina, Czech ice hockey player and coach
Paweł Lubina, Polish footballer
Lubina, a village and part of Kopřivnice in the Moravian-Silesian Region, Czech Republic

See also
Lubin (disambiguation)